Thomas Craven (January 6, 1888  – February 27, 1969) was an American author, critic and lecturer, who promoted the work of American Regionalist painters, Thomas Hart Benton, John Steuart Curry and Grant Wood, among others. He was known for his caustic comments and being the "leading decrier of the School of Paris."

Life
He was born in 1888, in Salina, Kansas, the son of Richard Price and Virginia Bates Cravens. He graduated from Kansas Wesleyan University in 1908. He was described as "a red-haired Kansan, as unassuming in private conversation as he is dogmatic on the printed page. He has been a reporter in Denver, a schoolmaster in California and Porto
Rico (sic), a deckhand in the West Indies, an unsuccessful painter and poet." He was friends with numerous artists of his day including George Grosz and Thomas Hart Benton. He married Aileen St. John-Brenon on August 25, 1923 and they were divorced in 1947. He summered in West Tisbury, on Martha's Vineyard and moved there permanently in 1949. He died in Boston, Massachusetts, on February 27, 1969, at the age of 81.

Writing career

He wrote numerous books, several were very popular including, Men of Art and Modern Art: the Men, the Movements, the Meaning both of which were Book-of–the-Month club selections.  Another of his books, A Treasury of Art Masterpieces: from the Renaissance to the Present Day reached the bestseller list and was re-issued several times. In addition he contributed essays, articles and criticisms to numerous periodicals including, Scribners, Harpers, The Dial, The Nation, The New Republic, The American Mercury, and The Forum.  At one time he was the art critic for the New York American.
An example of his "no holds barred" writing comes from the Introduction to Modern Art; the Men, the Movements, the Meaning:

However, despite the fact that he could be caustic, he was equally capable of providing praise. In describing John Steuart Curry's painting Baptism in Kansas, he says, "There was no burlesque in the picture, no satire, no sophisticated fooling. It was conceived in reverence and spiritual understanding, and executed with an honesty of purpose that is all too rare in any art."

Thomas Craven’s impact on the art world was significant. Any literature discussing the Regionalist painters makes reference to Mr. Craven’s work. He is discussed in Renegade Regionalists by James M. Dennis, John Steuart Curry's Pageant of America by Laurence E. Schmeckebier and Tom and Jack: The Intertwined Lives of Thomas Hart Benton and Jackson Pollock by Henry Adams. His influence is best described by the Time magazine’s review of his book, Men of Art:

Works
Selected essays
Men of Art: American Style, The American Mercury, December 1925.
George Bellows, The Dial, February 1926.
Have Painters Minds?, The American Mercury, March 1927.
The Criticism of Painting in America, The American Mercury, August 1927.
The Decline of Illustration, The American Mercury, October 1927.
Daumier, The Fighting Cartoonist, The Forum, September 1932
In Behalf of Boors, The American Spectator, April 1933.
Art and Propaganda, Scribner’s, March 1934.
Nationalism in Art, The Forum, June 1936.
Double-Dealers in Art, Scribner's, April 1938.
Our Decadent Art Museums, The American Mercury, December 1941.

Books
Paint, Harcourt, Brace and Company, 1923.
Men of Art, New York: Simon & Schuster, 1931.
Modern Art: the Men, the Movements, the Meaning, New York: Simon & Schuster, 1934.
A Treasury of American Prints: a Selection of One hundred Etchings and Lithographs by the Foremost Living American Artists, New York: Simon & Schuster, 1939.
A Treasury of Art Masterpieces: from the Renaissance to the Present Day, New York: Simon & Schuster, 1939; Simon & Schuster, 1977, .
Thomas Hart Benton, a descriptive catalogue of the works of Thomas Hart Benton...with an examination of the artist and his work, Associated American Artists, 1939.
The Story of Painting, From Cave Pictures to Modern Art, Simon & Schuster, 1943.
Cartoon Calvalcade, A Collection of the Best American Humorous Cartoons from the Turn of the Century to the Present, Simon & Schuster, 1943 (editor).
The Pocket Book of Old Masters. With W. Somerset Maugham and Walter Pater, edited by Herman J Wechsler. Pocket Books, Inc., 1949.
Famous Artists and their Models, New York: Pocket Books, 1949.
The Pocket Book of Greek Art, Pocket Books, 1950.
Rainbow Book of Art, World Publishing Company, 1956; World Pub., 1972, .

References

External links

"Craven, Thomas", Dictionary of Art Historians
"John Steuart Curry Papers,Correspondence and Project Files: Craven, Thomas, circa 1935-1946", Archives of American Art, Smithsonian Institution

1888 births
1969 deaths
Kansas Wesleyan University alumni
People from Salina, Kansas
20th-century American male writers